La Combattante (P730) ("The Fighter") was a fast patrol vessel of the French Navy. She was built in 1963 and was to be the prototype for a class of coastal patrol craft. La Combattante was operational in the French Navy from 1963 until 1985, when she was transferred to the French Coast Guard. She was discarded in 1994.

Design and construction
La Combattante was ordered from Constructions Mécaniques de Normandie (CMN), Cherbourg, on 5 December 1961. She was launched on 20 June 1963 and was completed in March 1964. La Combattante was built of laminated wood  and plastic, in order to have a small magnetic signature. She had an armament of one 40mm and two 12.7mm machine-guns, and a speed of 23 knots.

Her design inspired a series of similar vessels, including that of the Circé class coastal minehunters built by CMN in the 1990s, and the "La Combattante" type missile boats built by CMN for export.

Service history
La Combattante was commissioned on 1 March 1964, and saw service in France and overseas, in the French Indian Ocean and Pacific Ocean territories. In the late 60's La Combattante was used as the launch vehicle for trials of the Aérospatiale's Exocet missile. Following the success of these, and the adoption of the Exocet by the French Navy, La Combattante was equipped with four SS11 launchers. 
In January 1985 La Combattante was transferred to the Maritime Gendarmerie, the French coastguard service; her missile launchers were removed, though she kept her gun armament.  
In 1994 La Combattante was stricken.

Notes

References
  Gardiner, Robert; Chumbley, Stephen  Conway's All The World's Fighting Ships 1947–1995 (1995) Naval Institute Press, Annapolis

External links
La Combattante at netmarine.net (French)

Patrol vessels of the French Navy
Ships built in France